Gunnar Anton Edvard Asther (March 4, 1892 – February 28, 1974) was a Swedish sailor who competed in the 1932 Summer Olympics.

In 1932 he was a crew member of the Swedish boat Swedish Star which won the bronze medal in the Star class.

References

External links
 

1892 births
1974 deaths
Swedish male sailors (sport)
Olympic sailors of Sweden
Sailors at the 1932 Summer Olympics – Star
Olympic bronze medalists for Sweden
Olympic medalists in sailing

Medalists at the 1932 Summer Olympics
20th-century Swedish people